Pantoja Park is a public park located in the Marina District of Downtown San Diego, California.  Originally built in 1850, it is the oldest park in the city of San Diego.  The park is named for Don Juan Pantoja y Arriola, a Spanish navigator who drew the first map of San Diego Bay in 1782.  In the park stands a statue of Benito Juarez, a gift from the Mexican government in 1981.  Located on G Street near Columbia Street, Pantoja Park is a small oasis of open greenery in quickly redeveloping Downtown San Diego.

Pantoja Park features a large grassy area and multiple large mature trees.  The park has several towering old fig trees, shrubs and flowers, benches, walking paths, and a historic Natal Plum planted in the middle of the park.  Two years after the formation of San Diego's Historical Resources Board, Pantoja Park was registered as the seventh San Diego Historic Landmark in 1969.

See also
Marina District
List of parks in San Diego
List of San Diego Historic Landmarks

References

External links
 

History of San Diego
Landmarks in San Diego
Municipal parks in California
Parks in San Diego
Urban public parks
1850 establishments in California